The Journal of Catalysis is a monthly peer-reviewed scientific journal covering research on all aspects of heterogeneous and homogeneous catalysis. It is published by Elsevier and it was established in 1962 by Jan Hendrik de Boer and P. W. Selwood. The current editor-in-chief is Johannes A. Lercher (Technische Universität München). Other members of the editorial board include Bert Weckhuysen and Joachim Sauer. Former editors-in-chief have been F. S. Stone, W. K. Hall, G. L. Haller, W. N. Delgass, and E. Iglesia.

According to the Journal Citation Reports, the journal has a 2021 impact factor of 8.047.

References

External links 
 

Chemistry journals
Publications established in 1962
Elsevier academic journals
English-language journals
Monthly journals